Amphilius lujani is a species of fish in the family Amphiliidae, first found in the Lake Kyoga drainage, as well as the northeastern tributaries of Lake Victoria and Lake Manyara basin.

References

lujani
Freshwater fish of East Africa
Fish described in 2015
Taxa named by Lawrence M. Page